Lauren Spencer-Smith (born September 28, 2003) is a Canadian singer-songwriter from Vancouver Island. She appeared as a contestant on the 18th season of American Idol in 2020, placing in the top 20 in the competition.

Her 2019 album Unplugged, Vol. 1 was a Juno Award nominee for Adult Contemporary Album of the Year at the Juno Awards of 2020, but lost to Shine a Light by Bryan Adams.

In 2022, Spencer-Smith became more known internationally when her self-released song "Fingers Crossed" reached the top 20 in numerous countries, including the US and making the top 10 of the charts in numerous countries including Australia, New Zealand and Spencer-Smith's native United Kingdom. This was on the back of a demo of the song which had gone viral on TikTok. Spencer-Smith's rise to popularity and success on social media has sometimes been compared to that of American singer-songwriter Olivia Rodrigo. She released her song "Flowers" in 2022 and it has charted in several countries.

Early life
Spencer-Smith was born in Portsmouth, UK. She moved to Canada at the age of three with her parents and brother.

American Idol
During the Top 20 round in which she was eliminated from the competition, Spencer-Smith performed from her father's home in Port Alberni with a view of Sproat Lake in her background.

Discography

Live albums
 Unplugged, Vol. 1 (2019)
 Unplugged, Vol. 2 (2019)

Extended play
 Mixed Emotions (2020)

Singles

Notes

References

External links 
 

2003 births
21st-century Canadian women singers
21st-century Canadian singers
Canadian child singers
Living people
Musicians from Vancouver Island
English emigrants to Canada
Musicians from Portsmouth
People from Nanaimo
Canadian expatriates in England